Gbantu (Gwantu) is a dialect cluster of Plateau languages in Nigeria. Gwantu is the name of the principal dialect; the others are Numana, Janda and Numbu.

Varieties
Blench (2019) lists the following varieties in what he calls the Numbu–Gbantu-Nunku–Numana cluster.

Numbu
Gbantu
Nunku (three sub-dialects)
Nunku (spoken in Nunku and Ungwar Mallam)
Nunkucu (spoken in Nunkucu and Anku)
sub-dialect spoken in Nicok (Ungwar Jatau) and Ungwan Makama villages
Numana

References

Ninzic languages
Languages of Nigeria